Plodoyagodnaya (Yemeş-yeläk) is a rural locality (a village) in Bakalinsky Selsoviet, Bakalinsky District, Bashkortostan, Russia. The population was 189 as of 2010. There are 4 streets.

Geography 
Plodoyagodnaya is located 5 km southeast of Bakaly (the district's administrative centre) by road. Urman is the nearest rural locality.

References 

Rural localities in Bakalinsky District